Manuel Márquez de León International Airport  is an international airport located at La Paz, Baja California Sur, Mexico, near the Gulf of California. It handles national and international air traffic of the city of La Paz.

In 2020, the airport handled 563,691 passengers, and in 2021 it handled 920,000 passengers.

Airlines and destinations

Passenger

Statistics

Busiest routes

See also

 List of the busiest airports in Mexico

References

External links
 https://www.aeropuertosgap.com.mx/en/la-paz-3.html

Airports in Baja California Sur
La Paz, Baja California Sur